Ioan T. Morar (born  April 13, 1956) is a Romanian journalist, poet, dramatist, novelist, literary and art critic, diplomat and civil society activist. He is a founding member of the satirical magazine Academia Caţavencu (to which he notably contributes art and culture reviews) and, since 2004, a senior editor for Cotidianul. An amateur actor in his youth, he was also a member of the comedy troupe Divertis from the mid-1980s to 1996.

Biography
Born in Şeitin, Arad County, Morar graduated as a valedictorian from the University of Timişoara's Faculty of Philology (Romanian-French section) in 1981. During the period, he became active in student theater groups — his troupe's performance in the 1981 adaptation of Vasile Alecsandri's comedy Sânziana și Pepelea won it first prize during a festival in Iaşi (the city where he also met with and joined Divertis).

Assigned to a teaching position in Lugoj, he sat on the editorial staff for the magazines Viața Studențească and Amfiteatru after 1987. He also began writing his first works of drama and poetry, and joined the Writers' Union. Morar's works, translated into several languages, won him the Writers' Union debut prize (1984, for Vara indiană) and its poetry prize (2000, for Șovăiala).

Following the 1989 Revolution, he became a member of the Civic Alliance, while contributing to the newspaper Cuvântul. In 1990, Morar was employed by the national television station's Entertainment section and created several shows, but resigned the following year.

He authored his debut novel Lindenfeld in 2006, to critical acclaim. A fresco of a Swabian locality in the Banat (see Lindenfeld, Caraş-Severin), it is considered a "Postmodern novel". Lindenfeld was awarded the prize for prose works by the newspaper Ziarul de Iaşi.

Morar returned to work for national television in 2006, and began hosting his talk show Lumea citește! ("People Read!"), aired by TVR 1. During the same year, he was invited to take part in the final stage of TVR1's Mari Români campaign, a series which called on intellectuals to showcase the 10 greatest Romanians ever (who had been determined by a poll); Morar supported Domnitor Alexandru Ioan Cuza for the top position, and co-produced a short television film depicting the latter's merits. As part of a 2005-2006 television advertising campaign for Kandia chocolate bars, Morar impersonated the last ruler of Communist Romania, Nicolae Ceauşescu.

In early 2007, he left on an extended journey to New Caledonia, which he documented in a special blog for Academia Caţavencu, called Morar&More.

In 2010, he was named Romania's Consul General in Marseille, France. In 2013 he published his second work of prose, "Negru și Rosu", which was shortlisted for "Book of the Year" by "România literară".

His 2016 novel Sarbatoarea Corturilor won the Prose section of the Romanian Writers' Union Awards. His non-fiction travel journal/memoir Sapte Ani in Provence was awarded the Special Prize at the 2018 Romanian Writers' Union Awards. His 2020 book chronicling the use of false narratives by both government and citizens, under communist dictatorship, Fake News in Epoca de Aur won him the 2020 Romanian Writers' Union Award for Writer of the Month for July. 

In 2017 he was inducted into the Châteauneuf-du-Pape cupbearer group.

Morar won his European Court of Human Rights case against the Romanian state, as he argued that his sentence in a criminal defamation trial conviction was made in the absence of evidence and violated his journalistic freedom of expression.

Works
 Îmblânzitorul de metafore (1981)
 Vara indiană (1984)
 Fumul și spada (1989)
 Șovăiala (2000)
 Nerușinarea (2003)
 Lindenfeld (2005)
 Paloarea (2010)
 Negru și Roșu (2013). Translated into Spanish: Negro y rojo. Madrid, 2016. By Joaquin Garrigos.
 Sărbătoarea Corturilor (2016)
 Șapte Ani în Provence (2018)
 Fake News în Epoca de Aur (2020)

References

External links
 Morar&More
Video of the 2007 Kandia campaign
Marius Mihet, Împotriva comodității, în „Romania literara”, nr. 25/2016: http://www.romlit.ro/mpotriva_comoditii

Romanian magazine editors
Romanian magazine founders
Romanian poets
Romanian male poets
Romanian novelists
Romanian male novelists
Romanian art critics
Romanian humorists
Romanian literary critics
Romanian travel writers
Romanian activists
Romanian diplomats
Romanian television personalities
Romanian comedians
Postmodern writers
West University of Timișoara alumni
People from Arad County
1956 births
Living people